Wolfsbach is a town in the district of Amstetten in Lower Austria in Austria.

Geography
Wolfsbach lies in the Mostviertel in Lower Austria. About 6.84 percent of the municipality is forested.

References

Cities and towns in Amstetten District